The 1927 Buffalo Bisons football team represented the University of Buffalo as a member of the New York State Conference during the 1927 college football season. Led by Russell Carrick in his fourth season as head coach, the team compiled an overall record of 0–6–1 with a mark of 0–5–1 in conference play.

Schedule

References

Buffalo
Buffalo Bulls football seasons
College football winless seasons
Buffalo Bison football